Jeanette Yanikian (July 1935 – February 2008) was a guitarist, performance artist, and therapist who was born in Baghdad, Iraq and worked in the Netherlands.

Career 
Yanikian played electric guitar and bass guitar. These albums include Tam Tam / Bint (Composers’ Voice, 1981) Balans (Composers’ Voice, 1986) and Mausoleum / Hoketus (Composers’ Voice, 1992).

Working as a visual and sound artist, Yanikian's performance “Aorta” was shown at the 1987 Ars Electronica festival in Linz, Austria. Based on Yanikian's own research into the processes of the human body, "Aorta" used stethoscopes, intravenous sensors, and other medical equipment to explore the sonic perceptibility of heartbeats, respiration, and circulation.

Personal life and legacy 
Yanikian was married to Dutch composer Louis Andriessen in 1996, whom she met in 1957 while he was studying in the Hague. They lived together in Amsterdam and were partners for over 40 years.

She was an active member of the  Kommunistiese Partij Nederland/Marxisties Leninisties (KPN/ML).

Yanikian died in 2008 after battling a prolonged illness. Andriessen's five-part opera, La Commedia (2008), and David Lang’s evening-length work for string orchestra, darker (2010), are dedicated to Yanikian.

References 

1935 births
2008 deaths
Dutch guitarists
Dutch performance artists
Iraqi emigrants to the Netherlands
Socialist Party (Netherlands)